Cheshmeh Khazaneh (also Romanized as Cheshmeh Khazāneh; also known as Cheshmeh Kamūl Kharzān) is a village in Karezan Rural District, Karezan District, Sirvan County, Ilam Province, Iran. At the 2006 census, its population was 808, in 145 families. The village is populated by Kurds.

References 

Populated places in Sirvan County
Kurdish settlements in Ilam Province